The State University of Tocantinensis Region of Maranhão a.k.a. State University of South Maranhão (UEMASUL) is a state university in the northeastern state of Maranhão, Brazil.

External links 
 

Maranhao
Universities and colleges in Maranhão
2016 establishments in Brazil
Educational institutions established in 2016